The Walter Sagitta was a Czechoslovakian, air-cooled, inverted V-12 engine that first ran in 1937. This was one of several smaller, low-mass medium power pre-war V-12 engines produced. With a displacement of 18.4 liters (1,123 cu in), it produced up to 373 kW (550 hp) at 2,500 rpm.

Variants
Sagitta I-MR  at 2,500rpm at  - rated height 

Sagitta I-SR  at 2,500rpm at  - rated height

Sagitta II R.C., fully supercharged.

Alfa Romeo 122

Licensed production.

Applications
Fokker D.XXIII
Praga E-51
Rogožarski R-313
Savoia-Marchetti SM.86
VEF I-16

Specifications (Sagitta I-MR)

See also

References

Notes

Bibliography

 Gunston, Bill. World Encyclopedia of Aero Engines. Cambridge, England. Patrick Stephens Limited, 1989. 

Aircraft air-cooled V piston engines
1930s aircraft piston engines
Inverted V12 aircraft engines
Sagitta